Naarda fuliginaria is a moth in the family Noctuidae. This species was first described by George Thomas Bethune-Baker in 1911.

References

Herminiinae
Insects of Angola
Moths of Africa
Moths described in 1911